Echinophryne reynoldsi (known as the sponge anglerfish, Reynold's anglerfish, and Reynold's frogfish) is a species of fish in the family Antennariidae. It was first described in 1984 by Theodore Wells Pietsch III and Rudie Hermann Kuiter.

It is endemic to Australia, where it occurs inshore and is typically associated with sponges. It is a benthic oviparous species that reaches 8 cm (3.1 inches) in total length. Like other members of the genus Echinophryne but unlike most frogfish, the species does not have a distinct esca or "lure" on its illicium.

References 

Antennariidae
Fish described in 1984
Taxa named by Theodore Wells Pietsch III
Taxa named by Rudie Hermann Kuiter